The 2021 Benelux Tour is a road cycling stage race that took place from 30 August to 5 September 2021 in Belgium and the Netherlands. It was the first edition of the newly rebranded Benelux Tour and the 17th edition overall. The race was the 26th event on the 2021 UCI World Tour calendar.

Teams 
Of the 151 riders who started the race, 93 finished.

UCI WorldTeams

 
 
 
 
 
 
 
 
 
 
 
 
 
 
 
 
 
 
 

UCI ProTeams

Route

Stages

Stage 1 
30 August 2021 – Surhuisterveen to Dokkum,

Stage 2 
31 August 2021 – Lelystad to Lelystad,  (ITT)

Stage 3 
1 September 2021 – Essen to Hoogerheide,

Stage 4 
2 September 2021 – Aalter to Ardooie,

Stage 5 
3 September 2021 – Riemst to Bilzen,

Stage 6 
4 September 2021 – Ottignies-Louvain-la-Neuve to Houffalize,

Stage 7 
5 September 2021 – Namur to Geraardsbergen,

Classification leadership table 

 On stage 2, Phil Bauhaus, who was second in the points classification, wore the teal jersey, because first-placed Tim Merlier wore the blue jersey as the leader of the general classification. For the same reason, Tim Merlier wore the teal jersey on stage 3 with Stefan Bissegger as the leader of the general classification.

Final classification standings

General classification

Points classification

Combativity classification

Team classification

Notes

References

External links 
 

2021 UCI World Tour
2021 in Belgian sport
2021 in Dutch sport
2021
August 2021 sports events in the Netherlands
September 2021 sports events in Belgium